The Secretariat of Institutional Affairs is an agency linked to the Presidency of the Republic of Brazil. It was formed through Provisional Measura no. 259 of 21 July 2005 and converted into Law no. 11204 of 5 December 2005. It acted in the following areas:

 Political coordination of the Government;
 Conduction of the relationship between the Government, the National Congress and political parties;
 Interlocution with States, the Federal District and Municipalities;
 Coordination of the working of the Social and Economic Development Council.

It had its structure and organization defined by Decree no. 6207 of 18 September 2007. The head of the Secretariat had a status of Minister of State.

On 7 April 2015, the attributions of Institutional Affairs were transferred to the Vice President Office, at the time headed by Michel Temer, and the Secretariat was dissolved.

On 2 October 2015, the Secretariat of Government was created, which merged, among other attributions, the Institutional Affairs and political articulation with the Congress.

On 1 January 2023, it was reinstated by President Luiz Inácio Lula da Silva.

Secretaries

References

Government agencies of Brazil